West Side National Park is a national park covering the western half of Andros, the Bahamas, and the surrounding waters. The park is regarded as a marine protected area, which includes tidal creeks and coastal mangrove forest, as well as an expansive coastal zone.

Flora and fauna
Inland, the park contains areas of Caribbean pine, which provide habitat for atala butterflies. The mangrove areas include red, white and black mangroves, and buttonwood. The park provides an important feeding area for the West Indian flamingo. The Andros rock iguana is found on land, along with the Bahamian boa constrictor, Cuban twig anole, Bahama brown anole, Bahama green anole, blue-tail lizard, curly-tailed lizard, and Cuban tree frog. Hawksbill and green sea turtles are found throughout the park, and loggerhead turtles inhabit the northern part of the park. Conch, lobster, bonefish, Atlantic tarpon, the nurse shark, the bull shark and the smalltooth sawfish are found in the coastal waters.

References

National parks of the Bahamas
Andros, Bahamas